Schulz & Schulz is a TV series consisting of five feature-length films starring Götz George in a dual role as twin brothers Wolfgang and Walter Schulz who were separated during World War II and then raised in different parts of Germany. The first film was broadcast while the German Democratic Republic still existed. In the aftermath following the fall of the Berlin wall many new topics arose. The instalments showed how difficult it was for a great many citizens of the  German Democratic Republic to get accustomed to the new way of life and how German people tried to overcome all of that together.

Cast

Overview of all episodes

External links
 

1989 German television series debuts
1993 German television series endings
German-language television shows
ZDF original programming